The Princess of the Riviera is a 1926 German silent film directed by Géza von Bolváry.

Cast
 Hans Junkermann
 Ellen Kürti
 Julius Messaros

References

Bibliography

External links

1926 films
Films of the Weimar Republic
German silent feature films
Films directed by Géza von Bolváry
German black-and-white films
Bavaria Film films